The Estonia women's national bandy team represents Estonia in the sport of bandy. The 2018 Women's Bandy World Championship was their debut at the Women's Bandy World Championship.

Their most recent competition was the 2022 Women's Bandy World Championship held in Åby, Sweden.

Tournament record

World Championship
 2018 – Finished in 7th place
 2020 – Finished in 7th place
 2022 – Finished in 7th place

References 

National bandy teams
Bandy
Bandy in Estonia